Mike Quigley may refer to:

Mike Quigley (politician) (born 1958), U.S. Representative for Illinois
Mike Quigley (footballer) (born 1970), assistant manager of Chorley FC
Mike Quigley (businessman) (born 1953), past CEO of NBN Co

See also
Michael J. Quigley, expert in interrogation and counter-terrorism